Rulien Yeh (born 4 September 1984) is a former American badminton player who competed in international level events. She is a two-time bronze medalists at the Pan Am Badminton Championships, her doubles partner is her twin sister Rulan Yeh.

She has appeared in the films WEAPONiZED, Chance and Afterburn/Aftershock.

References

American female badminton players
People from Westminster, California
Twin sportspeople
1984 births
Living people
21st-century American women